Laurent Terzieff (27 June 1935, in Toulouse – 2 July 2010, in Paris) was a French actor.

Biography 
Terzieff was the son of French ceramist Marina and her husband Jean Terzieff, a Romanian-born sculptor of Russian and Romanian descent who came to France from Bucharest during the First World War. The original surname of his family was Chemerzin. As an adolescent, he was fascinated with philosophy and poetry. He assisted with a representation of the La Sonate des spectres by Strindberg, directed by Roger Blin; while involved in the theater he decided he wanted to become an actor.

Terzieff made his debut in 1953 at the Parisian  of Jean-Marie Serreau in Tous contre tous of Adamov. After several more roles, Marcel Carné offered him a lead role in 1958's Tricheurs, a tale about existentialist youth. He then appeared in the late works of French scenario writers such as Claude Autant-Lara, with whom he appeared in three films including Tu ne tueras point in 1961. Other collaborators included Henri-Georges Clouzot with La prisonnière, in which he interprets an artist manipulator. In 1975 Terzieff played the leading role as the priest in the Irish artist Reginald Gray's production and direction of Jeu. His partner Pascale de Boysson, Dirk Kinnane and Bibi Hure were also in the cast.

Other film appearances include Les Garcons by Mauro Bolognini in 1959, Vanina Vanini (1961), Two Weeks in September (1967), in which he appeared with Brigitte Bardot, The Milky Way (1969), Medea (1969), The Desert of the Tartars (1976), and the TV miniseries Moses the Lawgiver (1974), starring Burt Lancaster. In the 1980s, he primarily acted on stage. Appearances during this era include Rouge Baiser, Germinal in 1993, and The Raft of the Medusa in 1998. In 2005, he appeared in Mon petit doigt m'a dit''. Terzieff died on July 2, 2010, due to lung complications.

Awards and nominations

Molière Awards

Notes

External links 
 
 Portrait of Laurent Terzieff
 

1935 births
2010 deaths
20th-century French people
20th-century French male actors
French male film actors
French male television actors
French people of Romanian descent
French people of Russian descent
Male actors from Toulouse
Officers of the Ordre national du Mérite